The 2015 San Marino and Rimini Riviera motorcycle Grand Prix was the thirteenth round of the 2015 Grand Prix motorcycle racing season. It was held at the Misano World Circuit Marco Simoncelli in Misano Adriatico on 13 September 2015.

The MotoGP race started in dry conditions but as the race progressed, rain started to fall, forcing most of the riders to change to bikes with wet tyres. The rain eventually stopped halfway through the race and the final laps were completed in relatively dry track conditions. Factory Yamaha rider Jorge Lorenzo took his third pole position of the season but it was Marc Márquez who won the race after making a crucial second bike change before Valentino Rossi and Lorenzo. Bradley Smith and Scott Redding became the first pair of British riders to stand on a premier class podium since Barry Sheene and Tom Herron at the 1979 Venezuelan Grand Prix. Smith made a risky yet successful decision to stay on dry tyres for the whole duration of the race and achieved his second premier class podium in second place, while Redding achieved his maiden MotoGP podium with a third-place finish despite crashing earlier in the race.

Lorenzo and Rossi stayed out on wet tyres for a few laps longer than Márquez; this resulted in a fifth-place finish for Rossi and Lorenzo crashed out with eight laps remaining. Yonny Hernández and Alex de Angelis also crashed out while Pol Espargaró and wildcard Michele Pirro both retired. Loris Baz took his fourth victory in the Open category with a fourth-place finish. Although Rossi only managed to finish in fifth position, Lorenzo's retirement extended the championship gap between the two riders to 23 points.

In the junior classes, both pole-sitters won their respective races; Johann Zarco won his sixth race of the season in Moto2, while Enea Bastianini took his first Grand Prix victory in Moto3 after a final-lap pass on Miguel Oliveira.

Classification

MotoGP

Moto2

Moto3

Championship standings after the race (MotoGP)
Below are the standings for the top five riders and constructors after round thirteen has concluded.

Riders' Championship standings

Constructors' Championship standings

Teams' Championship standings

 Note: Only the top five positions are included for all standings.

References

San Marino
San Marino Motorcycle Grand Prix
San Marino and Rimini Riviera motorcycle Grand Prix
San Marino and Rimini Riviera motorcycle Grand Prix